Persoonia katerae is a plant in the family Proteaceae and is endemic to a small area on the coast of New South Wales.

Description
Its young branchlets are covered with greyish hairs. Flowering occurs from January to February and the fruit is a green drupe, sometimes suffused with purple.

Taxonomy
Persoonia katerae was first formally described in 1991 by P.H.Weston & L.A.S.Johnson in the journal Telopea from specimens collected near Boomerang Beach in 1988.

Distribution and habitat
This geebung grows in heath and forest on coastal sand between the Hastings River and Myall Lakes in coastal New South Wales.

References

katerae
Flora of New South Wales
Plants described in 1991
Taxa named by Peter H. Weston
Taxa named by Lawrence Alexander Sidney Johnson